Hans Yngve Höglund (23 July 1952 – 4 October 2012) was a Swedish shot putter. He competed in the 1976 Olympics and finished eighth. Höglund set his personal record of 21.33 m in Provo, Utah, United States, while winning the 1975 NCAA Championships for the University of Texas, El Paso. This results remains the Swedish national record. He also won three consecutive Swedish (1974–76) and NCAA titles (1973–1975).

References

External links
 
 

1952 births
2012 deaths
Swedish male shot putters
Olympic athletes of Sweden
UTEP Miners men's track and field athletes
Athletes (track and field) at the 1976 Summer Olympics